Brixton was a parliamentary constituency centred on the Brixton district of South London.  It returned one Member of Parliament (MP) to the House of Commons of the Parliament of the United Kingdom, elected by the first-past-the-post system.

History
The constituency was created for the 1885 general election, and abolished for the February 1974 general election, when it was largely replaced by the new Lambeth Central constituency.

Boundaries

1885–1918

The constituency was created by the Redistribution of Seats Act 1885, when the existing two-member Parliamentary Borough of Lambeth was divided into four single-member divisions. The seat, formally known as Lambeth, Brixton Division, comprised part of the civil parish of Lambeth, and was defined in terms of the wards used for elections to the parish vestry under the Metropolis Management Act 1855 as follows:
The parts of Brixton and Stockwell wards to the north of the centres of Acre Lane and Coldharbour Lane
The part of Vauxhall ward to the east of the centre of Clapham Road.

1918–1950

The Representation of the People Act 1918 redrew constituencies throughout Great Britain and Ireland. In London, the seats were redefined in terms of the wards of the Metropolitan Boroughs of the County of London, which had been created in 1900. Accordingly, the constituency was defined as consisting of the following areas of the Metropolitan Borough of Lambeth:
Stockwell ward.
The part of Brixton ward to the south of a line running from Clapham Road along the middle of Stockwell Park Road, Grove Road, Brixton Road, Mostyn Road, Akerman Road and Lothian Road and across Camberwell New Road to Wyndham Road.
The part of Herne Hill Ward to the north of a line running from Coldharbour Lane along the north side of the London, Brighton and South Coast Railway to Denmark Hill.
The part of Tulse Hill to the north and west of a line running along the middle of Brixton Hill from Mill Lane to Water Lane, along the middle of Water Lane to Effra Road, and along the middle of Effra Road to Coldharbour Lane.

1950–1974

The final boundary change was made by the Representation of the People Act 1948, and came into effect at the 1950 general election. The 1948 Act introduced the term "borough constituency". Due to a population decrease in Lambeth, the number of constituencies in the borough was reduced from four to three. The new Lambeth Brixton Borough Constituency was defined as consisting of four wards of the metropolitan borough as they existed at the end of 1947:
"The Angell, Stockwell, Town Hall, and Vassal wards of the borough of Lambeth"

Local government was completely reorganised in Greater London in 1965, and the metropolitan borough was abolished to be replaced by the larger London Borough of Lambeth. However these changes were not reflected in parliamentary boundaries until the general election of 1974. The Brixton constituency was largely replaced by the new seat of Lambeth Central

Members of Parliament

Elections

Elections in the 1880s 

Baggallay resigned after being appointed a Metropolitan Police Magistrate, causing a by-election.

Elections in the 1890s

Elections in the 1900s

Elections in the 1910s 

General Election 1914–15:

Another General Election was required to take place before the end of 1915. The political parties had been making preparations for an election to take place and by the July 1914, the following candidates had been selected; 
Unionist: Davison Dalziel
Liberal:

Elections in the 1920s

Elections in the 1930s 

General Election 1939–40

Another General Election was required to take place before the end of 1940. The political parties had been making preparations for an election to take place and by the Autumn of 1939, the following candidates had been selected; 
Conservative: Nigel Colman
Labour: Marcus Lipton

Elections in the 1940s

Elections in the 1950s

Elections in the 1960s

Elections in the 1970s

References 

Parliamentary constituencies in London (historic)
Constituencies of the Parliament of the United Kingdom established in 1885
Constituencies of the Parliament of the United Kingdom disestablished in 1974
Politics of the London Borough of Lambeth
History of the London Borough of Lambeth
Constituency
1885 establishments in England
1974 disestablishments in England